Sambaza is a  populated-place within the Zhob District of Balochistan, Pakistan.

References 

Populated places in Balochistan, Pakistan
Zhob District